Hillcrest High School is a public high school (grades 9–12), located in Memphis, Tennessee and is served by the Green Dot Public Schools system. The school has an enrollment of 525 students. The vast majority of students are African American. The school was previously operated by Memphis City Schools district, after MCS merged with the Shelby County Schools in July 2013.

School colors, mascot, and uniforms 
The school colors for Hillcrest High School are Kelly Green and White and the mascot is Vikings.

References

External links 

 Hillcrest High School Website

Public high schools in Tennessee
Schools in Memphis, Tennessee